The midpoint theorem or midline theorem states that if you connect the midpoints of two sides of a triangle then the resulting line segment will be parallel to the third side and have half of its length. The midpoint theorem generalizes to the intercept theorem, where you rather than using midpoints partition both sides in the same ratio.

The converse of the theorem is true as well. That is if you draw a line through the midpoint of triangle side parallel to another triangle side then the line will bisect the third side of the triangle.

The triangle formed by the three parallel lines through the three midpoints of sides of a triangle is called its medial triangle.

References



External links 
The midpoint theorem and its converse
The Mid-Point Theorem''
Midpoint theorem and converse Euclidean explained Grade 10+12  (video, 5:28 mins)
midpoint theorem at the Proof Wiki

Theorems about triangles